Amaxades (Bulgarian: Арабаджи) is a village and a former community in the Rhodope regional unit, East Macedonia and Thrace, Greece. Since the 2011 local government reform it is part of the municipality Iasmos, of which it is a municipal unit. The municipal unit has an area of 34.300 km2. The population is 1,773 (2011). South of the village are the remains of the Byzantine-era town Anastasiopolis-Peritheorion.

References

Populated places in Rhodope (regional unit)